Chris Graham may refer to:

Chris Graham (American football)
Chris Graham (boxer), Canadian boxer who competed in the 1920s
Chris Graham (director), New Zealand film director

See also
Christopher Graham, UK Information Commissioner